Islamabad Railway Station (formerly Margalla railway station) is located in sector I-9 in Islamabad, Capital Territory, Pakistan. The station appears as Margala on the Pakistan Railways website.

History
The station was established in 1979 and inaugurated on 21 November 1979 by Minister for Railways Muhammad Khan Junejo. A rail shuttle was started between Islamabad and Rawalpindi. The shuttle was suspended within a year due to financial loss and the station closed down. In 1988, freight train services were started from this railway station, but the service was suspended after a while. The station was shut for the next 29 years.

As a result of an increase in the population and commercial activities of Islamabad, the station was renovated. It was also renamed to Islamabad railway station. Operations started from 21 April 2009 on trial basis. Railways Minister Ghulam Ahmad Bilour inaugurated it on 13 May 2009.

On 15 May 2015, a new express train named Green Line Express was launched at the station, linking Islamabad to Karachi.

Connections
The nearest Khayaban-e-Johar Metrobus Station, part of the Rawalpindi-Islamabad Metrobus, is 17 mins (1.4 km) walk away.

See also
 List of railway stations in Pakistan
 Pakistan Railways
 Green Line Express

References 

Railway stations in Islamabad Capital Territory
Transport in Islamabad